The 1968 Utah Redskins football team was an American football team that represented the University of Utah as a member of the Western Athletic Conference (WAC) during the 1968 NCAA University Division football season. In their first season under head coach Bill Meek, the Redskins compiled an overall record of 3–7 with a mark of 2–3 against conference opponents, placing fifth in the WAC. Home games were played on campus at Ute Stadium in Salt Lake City.

Schedule

NFL/AFL draft
Three Utah players were selected in the 1969 NFL/AFL draft.

References

External links
 Game program: Utah at Washington State – October 5, 1968

Utah
Utah Utes football seasons
Utah Redskins football